The 2018 Categoría Primera A season (officially known as the 2018 Liga Águila season for sponsorship reasons) was the 71st season of Colombia's top-flight football league. The season began on 2 February and concluded on 16 December. Millonarios were the defending champions.

In the Torneo Apertura, Deportes Tolima won their second league title on 9 June, after tying with Atlético Nacional 2–2 on aggregate score in the finals and then beating them 4–2 on penalties and in the Torneo Finalización, Junior won their eighth title on 16 December, following a 5–4 win against Independiente Medellín on aggregate score in the finals.

Format
The league was played under the same format used since the 2015 season, with the exclusion of the regional derby matchday in the first stage of both the Apertura and Finalización tournaments being the only change to be applied for this season. Both tournaments were divided into three stages: a first stage which was contested on a single round-robin basis, with each team playing the other teams once for a total of 19 matches. The top eight teams after the nineteen rounds advanced to a knockout round, where they were drawn into four ties to be played on a home-and-away basis, with the four winners advancing to the semifinals and the winners of each semifinal advancing to the final of the tournament. The winners of the final in each tournament were declared as champions. Relegation to Categoría Primera B by average continued being used.

Teams
20 teams took part, eighteen of them returning from last season plus Boyacá Chicó and Leones, who were promoted from the 2017 Primera B. Leones became the first team to secure promotion, after winning the Torneo Finalización on 26 November 2017, and competed in the Primera A for the first time ever. On the other hand, Boyacá Chicó sealed their promotion on 6 December 2017, by winning the Primera B championship on penalty kicks against Leones. They returned to the top tier after just one year. Both promoted teams replaced Cortuluá and Tigres who were relegated at the end of the last season.

Stadia and locations 

a: Atlético Huila played their first three home games in the Torneo Apertura (against Deportivo Cali, Junior, and La Equidad) at Estadio Manuel Murillo Toro in Ibagué due to their regular stadium Estadio Guillermo Plazas Alcid not meeting DIMAYOR's stadium requirements.
b: Jaguares played their first three home games in the Torneo Apertura (against La Equidad, Deportes Tolima, and Patriotas) at Estadio Armando Tuirán Paternina in Sahagún due to works on the artificial lighting system at Estadio Jaraguay which enabled it to meet DIMAYOR's stadium requirements.

c: Junior played their home matches against Deportivo Pasto, Atlético Huila, and Rionegro Águilas at Estadio Romelio Martínez in Barranquilla instead of their regular stadium Estadio Metropolitano Roberto Meléndez.

Managerial changes

Torneo Apertura

First stage
The First stage began on 2 February and consisted of nineteen rounds with teams playing each other once. It ended on 6 May with the top eight teams at the end of this stage advancing to the knockout phase.

Standings

Results

Knockout phase bracket

Quarterfinals

|}

First leg

Second leg

Semifinals

|}

First leg

Second leg

Finals

Tied 2–2 on aggregate, Deportes Tolima won on penalties.

Top goalscorers

Source: Dimayor

Torneo Finalización

First stage
The First stage began on 20 July and featured the same format used in the Torneo Apertura, with reversed fixtures. It concluded on 11 November with the top eight teams at the end of this stage advancing to the knockout stage.

Standings

Results

Knockout phase bracket

Quarterfinals

First leg

Second leg

Semifinals

First leg

Second leg

Finals

Junior won 5–4 on aggregate.

Top goalscorers

Source: Dimayor, Soccerway

Aggregate table

Relegation
A separate table was kept to determine the teams that get relegated to the Categoría Primera B for the next season. The table included an average of all first stage games played for the current season and the previous two seasons. For purposes of elaborating the table, promoted teams were given the same point and goal tallies as the team in the 18th position at the start of the season.

Source: DimayorRules for classification: 1st average; 2nd goal difference; 3rd number of goals scored; 4th away goals scored.

See also
 2018 Categoría Primera B season
 2018 Copa Colombia

References

External links 
 Dimayor's official website 

Categoría Primera A seasons
Categoria Primera A season
1